Prof. İbrahim Tarık Özbolat is a Turkish scientist and academic at the Pennsylvania State University (State College, United States). He specializes in manufacturing and tissue engineering, with numerous articles published in the context of bioprinting. He received his Ph.D. in Industrial and Systems Engineering from University at Buffalo, The State University of New York, New York, and dual B.S. degrees in Mechanical Engineering and in Industrial Engineering from Middle East Technical University Ankara, Turkey. He is the principal investigator for the Ozbolat Lab in the Millennium Science Complex at the Huck Institute of the Life Sciences.

Books
 3D Bioprinting: Fundamentals, Principles and Applications
 3D Bioprinting in Tissue and Organ Regeneration

References

External links
 International Business Times, 2016
 R&D Magazine, 2016
 3DPrint.com, 2016
 The HuffingtonPost, 2014
 National Journal, 2014
 Science Daily, 2013
 Industrial Engineer, January 2013
 Physics World, 2013

1983 births
Living people
Turkish scientists
Turkish academics
University of Iowa faculty
University at Buffalo alumni